The Pharr Cabin is a historic summer cabin at 2 North Mountain in Bella Vista, Arkansas.  It is a wood-frame structure with a gable roof, presenting a single story to the front, and two to the rear on its steeply sloping lot.  A porch extends across the front (south-facing) facade, with a lower-pitch gable roof.  A large fieldstone chimney rises through both of these roofs.  An open deck runs along the eastern facade.  The sleeping areas on the lower level are enclosed only by screening.  The cabin was built c. 1920, and is one of a small number of little-altered cabins built in that period in Bella Vista.

The cabin was listed on the National Register of Historic Places in 1988.

See also
National Register of Historic Places listings in Benton County, Arkansas

References

Houses on the National Register of Historic Places in Arkansas
Houses completed in 1920
Houses in Benton County, Arkansas
National Register of Historic Places in Benton County, Arkansas
Buildings and structures in Bella Vista, Arkansas
1920 establishments in Arkansas